Church musician (Kirchenmusiker) is a music profession in Germany.

At present there are about 3,600 main job  and 25,000 second job church musicians in the Protestant and Catholic Church in Germany.

There are four different degrees of examination: A, B, C and D. A and B requires a study at a music college or a university (Master of Arts, Bachelor of Arts) . Church musicians with C and D are trained mostly by main job church musicians. The study of A takes about 12 semester and B 8 semester.

Subjects of education are organ, improvising, piano, singing, conducting, ear training, composition, score reading and figured bass, liturgics, hymnology, music history, organology.

Music colleges for church music (Hochschulen für Kirchenmusik)
 Bayreuth – Evangelische Hochschule für Kirchenmusik Bayreuth
 Dresden – Evangelische Hochschule für Kirchenmusik Dresden
 Görlitz – Hochschule für Kirchenmusik der Evangelischen Kirche Berlin-Brandenburg - schlesische Oberlausitz
 Halle (Saale) – Evangelische Hochschule für Kirchenmusik Halle
 Heidelberg – Hochschule für Kirchenmusik Heidelberg
 Herford – Hochschule für Kirchenmusik der Evangelischen Kirche von Westfalen
 München – Hochschule für Musik und Theater München
 Regensburg – Hochschule für Katholische Kirchenmusik und Musikpädagogik Regensburg
 Rottenburg am Neckar – Katholische Hochschule für Kirchenmusik Rottenburg
 Stuttgart - Staatliche Hochschule für Musik und Darstellende Kunst Stuttgart
 Tübingen – Evangelische Hochschule für Kirchenmusik Tübingen

References

Beruf und Aufgaben der Evangelischen Kirchenmusikerinnen und Kirchenmusiker, edited by the Verband Evangelischer Kirchenmusikerinnen und Kirchenmusiker in Deutschland 1996, new edition 2011

External links